Chimalapa may refer to:

Biology
Exerodonta chimalapa

Geography
San Miguel Chimalapa, Oaxaca
Santa María Chimalapa, Oaxaca
Chimalapas montane forests in the Sierra Chimalapa of Oaxaca

Languages
Chimalapa Zoque

Others
Chimalapas territory conflict